Nazaré Paulista is a municipality in the state of São Paulo in Brazil. The population is 18,698 (2020 est.) in an area of 326.3 km². It is within the Atlantic Forest biome and is a major source of water for the city of São Paulo, hosting the Atibainha reservoir of the Cantareira System. Nazaré Paulista is also home to the nationally known conservation organization, the Instituto de Pesquisas Ecológicas (Institute for Ecological Research).

References 

Municipalities in São Paulo (state)